Helianthus pauciflorus, called the stiff sunflower, is a North American plant species in the family Asteraceae. It is widespread across the Great Plains, the Rocky Mountains, and the Great Lakes region, and naturalized in scattered locations in the eastern United States and in much of southern Canada (from Alberta to Nova Scotia).

Most of the leaves are attached near the bottom of the stem. One plant can produces 1-10 flower heads, each head with 10-20 yellow ray florets surrounding at least 75 red or (less often) yellow disc florets.

Hybrids between H. pauciflorus and H. tuberosus (Jerusalem artichoke) are known as H. × laetiflorus. The name H. laetiflorus has also been used as a synonym of H. pauciflorus.

 Subspecies
 Helianthus pauciflorus subsp. subrhomboideus (Rydb.)

References

External links
 
 
 
 
 
 

pauciflorus
Plants described in 1818
Flora of North America